is a Japanese football player. He plays for Cobaltore Onagawa.

Playing career
Shuhei Doen played for Grulla Morioka from 2012 to 2014. He moved to Verspah Oita in 2015.

Club statistics
Updated to 26 February 2018.

References

External links

1990 births
Living people
University of Tsukuba alumni
Association football people from Hyōgo Prefecture
Japanese footballers
J3 League players
Japan Football League players
Iwate Grulla Morioka players
Verspah Oita players
Arterivo Wakayama players
Cobaltore Onagawa players
Association football defenders